Sari Beygluy-e Musai (also Romanized as Sārī Beyglūy-e Mūsá‘ī; also known as Sārī Beyglū) is a village in Baranduz Rural District, in the Central District of Urmia County, West Azerbaijan Province, Iran. At the 2006 census, its population was 200, in 52 families.

References 

Populated places in Urmia County